The Sauber C5 is a Group 6 prototype racing car, designed, developed and built by the Swiss Sauber team, specifically made to compete in the 1977 24 Hours of Le Mans and the 1978 24 Hours of Le Mans. It is powered by a naturally aspirated  BMW M12 four-cylinder engine. It scored 15 race wins, 31 podiums, clinched 1 pole position, and 6 wins in its class. With these statistics, it makes it one of the most successful early Sauber sports cars.

References

Rear-wheel-drive vehicles
Mid-engined cars
Sports prototypes
Cars introduced in 1975
Cars of Switzerland
Sauber Motorsport
Group 6 (racing) cars